City of Crime may refer to:
 Batman: City of Crime, a 2005-2006 Batman comic book story arc
 "City of Crime," a song performed by Dan Aykroyd and Tom Hanks from the 1987 film Dragnet

See also
Whispering City, also known as Crime City, a 1947 film
City Crimes, an 1840 novel